Merely Mrs. Stubbs is a 1917 British silent drama film directed by Henry Edwards and starring Edwards, Alma Taylor and Lionelle Howard.

Cast
 Henry Edwards as Joe Stubbs
 Alma Taylor as Edith Dudley
 Lionelle Howard as Sidney Dudley
 Mary Rorke as Mrs. Stubbs
 Ruth Mackay as Mrs. Quiltuck
 Charles Vane as Grandfather
 Fred Johnson as Ingram
 W.G. Saunders as Solicitor
 Molly Hamley-Clifford as Woman

References

External links

1917 films
British silent feature films
1917 drama films
Films directed by Henry Edwards
British drama films
Hepworth Pictures films
British black-and-white films
1910s English-language films
1910s British films
Silent drama films